Bowmans is a part of the town of Dartford in Kent, England. It is located to the south-west of the town centre.

Villages in Kent